Marcel Kunstmann (born June 6, 1988) is a German footballer who currently plays for TSV Krähenwinkel/Kaltenweide.

External links

1988 births
Living people
German footballers
FC Hansa Rostock players
VfL Osnabrück players
Wormatia Worms players
3. Liga players
Association football forwards
TSV Havelse players